Yagi Akiko (1895–1983) was an anarchist writer and activist. She wrote for anarchist women's arts journals Fujin Sensen (The Women's Front) and Nyonin Geijutsu (Women's Arts) on topics including bolshevism, the commercial commodification of women, and the imperial founding of Manchukuo, a puppet state that she described as a slave, having traded one imperial ruler for another. Her travelogue "Letters from a Trip to Kyushu", written with Fumiko Hayashi, tells of their drinking and meeting men, as two modern women outré for the time period.

References

Further reading 

 
 

1895 births
1983 deaths
Japanese anarchists
Japanese feminists
Japanese writers